Fowler is an English and/or Scots surname. Its origin is the Old English , an occupational name for a bird-catcher or hunter of wild birds. Old English  or  means "bird" and has evolved into the modern word fowl.

Notable Fowlers

Born before 1700
 Constance Aston Fowler (born "Constance Aston"), English author and anthologist
 Edward Fowler (bishop) (1632–1714), English churchman, Bishop of Gloucester
 Eliza Haywood (born "Elizabeth Fowler" 1693–1756), English writer, actress and publisher
 Richard Fowler (chancellor) (c.1425–1477) - Chancellor of the Exchequer to Edward IV
 Thomas Fowler (courtier), (d. 1590), steward of the Countess of Lennox, and spy
 William Fowler (makar) (c. 1560–1612), Scottish poet, writer, courtier, and translator

Born after 1700
 Charles Fowler (1792–1867), English architect
 John Fowler (politician) (1755–1840), American national politician
 Robert Fowler (archbishop) (1724–1801), Archbishop of Dublin in the Church of Ireland
 Robert Fowler (bishop) (1767–1841), his son, Bishop of Ossory in the Church of Ireland
 Robert Merrick Fowler (1778–c1850), Royal Navy officer
 Samuel Fowler (1779–1844), New Jersey Congressman from 1833 to 1837
 Thomas Fowler (inventor) (1777–1843), English inventor
 William Chauncey Fowler (1793–1881), American scholar, son-in-law and assistant to Noah Webster

Born after 1800

 Alfred Fowler (1868–1940), English astronomer
 Bertha Fowler (1866-1952), American educator, preacher, deaconess
 Beryl Fowler (1881–1963), English painter
 Charles A. Fowler (1832–1896), American lawyer and politician
 Charles Henry Fowler (1837–1908), Canadian-American Bishop of the Methodist Episcopal Church
 C. Hodgson Fowler (1840–1910), English ecclesiastical architect
 Charles N. Fowler (1852–1932), American national politician
 Edmund John Fowler (1861–1926), Irish soldier and recipient of the Victoria Cross
 Francis George Fowler (1871–1918), English writer on English language, grammar and usage
 Frank Fowler (1852–1910), American artist
 Frank Oliver Fowler (1861–1945), Canadian politician in Manitoba, Mayor of Winnipeg
 George Fowler (politician) (1839–1896), South Australian politician
 George William Fowler (1859–1924) Canadian politician and lawyer
 Harriet Putnam Fowler (1842–1901), American writer
 Henry Fowler, 1st Viscount Wolverhampton (1830–1911), English national politician, Secretary of the Treasury, Secretary of State for India
 Sir Henry Fowler (engineer), (1870–1938) English locomotive engineer
 Henry Fowler (died 1896), one of a pair of Victorian murderers, known as Milsom and Fowler
 Henry Watson Fowler (1858–1933), English schoolmaster, lexicographer and commentator on the usage of English
 Henry Weed Fowler (1878–1965), American zoologist
 Jack Fowler (footballer born 1899) (born 1899), Welsh footballer
 Jack Beresford Fowler (1893–1972), Australian little theatre director
 Jesse Fowler (1898–1973), American professional baseball player
 Sir John Fowler, 1st Baronet (1817–1898), English railway engineer
 John Fowler (agricultural engineer) (1826–1864), English agricultural engineer
 John Edgar Fowler (1866–1930), American national politician
 Joseph S. Fowler (1820–1902), American national politician
 Lilian Fowler (1886–1954), Australian politician
 Lydia Folger Fowler (1823–1879), pioneering American physician, activist, and professor of medicine.
 Orson Squire Fowler (1809–1887), American phrenologist
 Ralph H. Fowler (1889–1944), English physicist and astronomer
 Sir Robert Fowler, 1st Baronet (1828–1891), Lord Mayor of London
 Robert Fowler (athlete) (1882–after 1981), Newfoundland-born Olympian and world record holder (marathon)
 Robert G. Fowler (1884–1966), American aviation pioneer
 Robert Henry Fowler (1857–1957), Irish cricketer
 Robert St Leger Fowler (1891–1925), Irish cricketer and captain of Eton in the famous Eton v Harrow match of 1910
 Samuel Fowler (1851–1919), New Jersey Congressman from 1889 to 1893
 J. Samuel Fowler (1874–1961), New York politician
 Thomas Fowler (academic) (1832–1904), Vice-Chancellor of the University of Oxford
William Henry Fowler (1854-1932), founder of Fowler's Calculators
 William Warde Fowler (1847–1921), English historian and ornithologist, tutor at Lincoln College, Oxford
 William Weekes Fowler (1849–1923), Entomologist

Born after 1900
 Alan Fowler (footballer)
 Art Fowler (1922–2007), American professional baseball player & pitching coach
 Bobby Jack Fowler (1939–2006), American serial killer
 Boob Fowler (1900–1988), American professional baseball player
 Bruce Fowler (born 1948), American trombonist
 Calvin Fowler (1940–2013), American Olympic basketball player
 Cary Fowler (born 1949), agricultural conservationist
 Catherine S. Fowler (born 1940) American anthropologist
 Daphne Fowler (born 1939), English quiz show champion
 David Fowler (mathematician) (1937–2004), English math historian
 Donald Fowler (1935-2020), American politician
 Don D. Fowler (born 1936), American anthropologist and archaeologist
 Earl B. Fowler (1925–2008), Admiral, United States Navy
 H. M. Fowler (1918–2014), American politician
 Hal Fowler (born 1927), American amateur World Champion poker player
 Hedley Fowler (1916-1944), English RAF Pilot who escaped from Colditz Castle
 Henry H. Fowler (1908–2000), American lawyer and Secretary of the Treasury
 Hugh S. Fowler (1912–1975), American film editor
 Ian Fowler (1939–2013), British journalist
 James Bonard Fowler (1933-2015), Alabama State Trooper convicted of shooting unarmed civil rights protestor Jummie Lee Jackson
 James W. Fowler (born 1940), American psychologist, academic and Methodist clergyman
 Jim Fowler (1930–2019), American zoologist and television personality
 Keith Fowler (born 1939), American educator (professor), actor, director 
 Michael Fowler (born 1929), New Zealand architect and Mayor of Wellington 
 Norman Fowler (born 1938), English national politician and peer (Lord Fowler)
 Ron Fowler (born 1943/1944) executive chairman of the San Diego Padres and CEO of Liquid Investments Incorporated
 Thomas W. Fowler (1921–1944), World War II American Army officer, recipient of the Medal of Honor
 Tillie K. Fowler (1942–2005), American national politician
 Tommy Fowler (born 1924), English professional footballer
 William Alfred Fowler (1911–1995), American astrophysicist
 Wyche Fowler (born 1940), American national politician and diplomat

Born after 1950
 Ally Fowler (born 1961), Australian actress
 Bernard Fowler (born "Royland Bernard Fowler", 1959), American singer, producer, songwriter
 Brian Fowler (cyclist) (born 1962), New Zealand Olympic cyclist
 Cam Fowler (born 1991), Canadian ice hockey player
 Carlos Fowler (born 1972), American football player
 Charlie Fowler (1954–2006), American mountain climber, writer, and photographer
 Chris Fowler (born 1962), American sports journalist
 Christopher Fowler (1953–2023), English fiction author
 Damon Fowler, American blues singer, guitarist, and songwriter
 Dennis Fowler (living), American surgeon and hospital executive
 Dexter Fowler (born 1986), American professional baseball center fielder
 Dustin Fowler (born 1994), American professional baseball outfielder
 Don Paul Fowler (1953–1999), English classicist
 Emma Fowler (born 1979), British biathlete and Army corporal
 Graeme Fowler (born 1957), English professional cricketer
 James H. Fowler (born 1970), American political scientist
 Jason Fowler (dancer) (living), New York City Ballet soloist
 Jason Fowler (footballer) (born 1974), English professional footballer
 Karen Joy Fowler (born 1950), American fiction author
 Kevin Spacey (born "Kevin Fowler", 1959), American actor
 Martin Fowler (footballer) (born 1957), former English professional footballer
 Martin Fowler (software engineer) (born 1963), English-American software architecture author
 Mick Fowler (born 1956), British mountaineer
 Nick Fowler (living), New York novelist, singer, songwriter
 Pete Fowler (born 1969), Welsh illustrator
 Peter Fowler (born 1959), Australian professional golfer
 Rickie Fowler (born 1988), American professional golfer
 Ryan Fowler (born 1982), American professional football player
 Robbie Fowler (born 1975), English footballer
 Samuel Fowler (disambiguation), several men of this name 
 Simon Fowler (born 1965), English musician
 Simon Fowler (author) (born 1956), British historian
 Therese Fowler (born 1967), American fiction author
 Tom Fowler (artist) (living), Canadian comic artist
 Tom Fowler (musician) (born 1951), American musician

Brocklebank-Fowler
 Christopher Brocklebank-Fowler (1934-2020), British politician

Distribution
The "Fowler" surname evolved from an original use of "" in the early 13th Century. The surname is uncommon in the United States, appearing with a rank of 250 in the 1990 Census and a rank of 267 in the 2000 Census, 27½% of the American population being accounted for surnames in the ranks of 1 to 250.  In 19th Century England, "Fowler" was widespread, appearing in 35 of the 39 historic counties, with higher density in the north of England, in the 1891 Census of England and Wales.  Meanwhile, in 19th Century United States, "Fowler" appears in every surveyed state in both the 1880 US Census and 1840 US Census, showing a higher concentration in New York state in each case.

Fictional characters
Sam and Amanda Fowler, fictional characters in U.S. soap opera Another World
 Amy Farrah Fowler, from the American sitcom The Big Bang Theory
 House Fowler, one of the noble houses of Dorne in the series A Song of Ice and Fire by George R. R. Martin

EastEnders
Several characters in the British soap opera EastEnders share the "Fowler" surname:
 Arthur Fowler
 Arthur Brian Fowler
 Bex Fowler
 Gill Fowler
 Hope Fowler
 Lily Fowler
 Lisa Fowler
 Mark Fowler
 Mark Fowler (2016 character)
 Martin Fowler (EastEnders)
 Michelle Fowler
 Pauline Fowler
 Ruth Fowler
 Sonia Fowler
 Stacey Fowler
 Vicki Fowler

See also

Human name disambiguation pages
 Charles Fowler (disambiguation)
 Henry Fowler (disambiguation)
 James Fowler (disambiguation)
 John Fowler (disambiguation)
 Martin Fowler (disambiguation)
 Raymond Fowler (disambiguation)
 Samuel Fowler (disambiguation)
 Tom Fowler (disambiguation)
 Robert Fowler (disambiguation)

References

English-language surnames
Occupational surnames
English-language occupational surnames